Eclipse Records is an American independent record label based in Butler, New Jersey. The label is best known for bringing the Cleveland band Mushroomhead to national attention. The  president of the label is Chris Poland, not to be confused with the former guitarist of Megadeth who happens to have the same name.

History

Eclipse Records was founded in 1997 by owner Chris Poland.

Eclipse Records releases few albums compared to other labels their size. President Chris Poland states that he believes that a record company should try to work on making each album "hit material", instead of putting out as many albums as possible to gain recognition. The label has also focused efforts on using new technology such as digital distribution to increase its bands' exposure in a competitive music market. In September 2017, Eclipse Records signed Genus Ordinis Dei, a symphonic death metal band from Crema, Italy to their roster.

Roster
The following artists have albums released with Eclipse Records.

Current
 A Breach of Silence
 Benthos
 Blacklist 9
 Blowsight
 Cold Snap
 Despite
 Mindshift
 Naberus
 Our Last Enemy
 Saint Diablo
 Shape Of Water
 Sixty Miles Ahead
 Sifting
 Tomorrow Is Lost

Past 
 Alev
 Bobaflex
 Cipher
 Dead By Wednesday
 Dirt Church
 Disarray (band)
 Five Foot Thick
 Megaherz
 Mushroomhead
 Run for Cover
 Scum of the Earth, led by the former Rob Zombie guitarist "Riggs"

References

External links
 

American record labels
Record labels established in 1997
Heavy metal record labels
Rock record labels
American independent record labels